Henri Leconte was the defending champion, but lost in the quarterfinals this year.

Mats Wilander won the title, defeating Tomáš Šmíd 6–1, 7–5 in the final.

Seeds

  Mats Wilander (champion)
  Gene Mayer (second round)
  Andrés Gómez (third round)
  Johan Kriek (quarterfinals)
  Vitas Gerulaitis (semifinals)
  Brian Gottfried (quarterfinals)
  Henri Leconte (quarterfinals)
  Hank Pfister (third round)
  Steve Denton (second round)
  Tomáš Šmíd (final)
  Henrik Sundström (third round)
  Wojtek Fibak (third round)
  Mel Purcell (second round)
  Anders Järryd (third round)
  Shlomo Glickstein (third round)
  Heinz Günthardt (quarterfinals)

Draw

Finals

Top half

Section 1

Section 2

Bottom half

Section 3

Section 4

References

 Main Draw

Stockholm Open
1983 Grand Prix (tennis)